Thorvaldson may refer to:

 Erik Thorvaldson, aka, Erik the Red (950–1003), the Icelandic-Norwegian Viking founder of Norse Greenland
 Gunnar Thorvaldson (1901-1960), Canadian politician
 Sveinn Thorvaldson (1872–1950), Canadian politician
 Thorbergur Thorvaldson (1883-1965), Icelandic-Canadian chemist

 Thorvaldson Lake, Saskatchewan, Canada

See also 

 Thorvaldsen